The Centre for Enabling EA Learning & Research (abbreviated CEEALAR, formerly EA Hotel) supports individuals to self-educate and work towards charitable aims within the framework of effective altruism (EA). It provides successful applicants with grants for free or subsidised accommodation, catering within the centre and a stipend.

History 
The centre was founded by Greg Colbourn, a former 3D-printing entrepreneur who became involved in the effective altruism movement. He announced the purchase of a former 17-room hotel in central Blackpool in an effective altruism forum on the 4th of June 2018. The hotel cost £130,000, which he paid for using personal profits from successful cryptocurrency investments. CEEALAR was registered as a charitable incorporated organisation in England and Wales on the 3rd of June 2020.

References

External links 
 
 

2018 establishments in England
Organizations associated with effective altruism
Organizations established in 2018
Charities based in Lancashire